The 1881 Wimbledon Championships took place on the outdoor grass courts at the All England Lawn Tennis and Croquet Club in Wimbledon, London, United Kingdom. The tournament ran from 2 to 13 July. It was the 5th edition of the Wimbledon Championships, and the first Grand Slam tennis event of 1881. The defending champion John Hartley lost in straight sets in the final to challenger William Renshaw, who defeated Hartley in 37 minutes, 6–0, 6–1, 6–1. The result is said to have been influenced by Hartley suffering from an attack of 'English cholera'.

Gentlemen's singles

Final

 William Renshaw defeated  John Hartley, 6–0, 6–1, 6–1

All Comers' Final
 William Renshaw defeated  Richard Richardson, 6–4, 6–2, 6–3

References

External links
 Official Wimbledon Championships website

 
Wimbledon Championship
Wimbledon Championship
Wimbledon Championship
July 1881 sports events